Monoquet is an unincorporated community in Plain Township, Kosciusko County, in the U.S. state of Indiana.

History
Monoquet [muh-NUH-kwet] was laid out in 1834, later being founded in 1844 when a post office was established on January 29, 1844; closed on April 17, 1851. 

The village was named after the Potawatomi Chief Monoquet of the Tippecanoe.

Geography

References

Unincorporated communities in Kosciusko County, Indiana
Unincorporated communities in Indiana